A general election was held in the U.S. state of New Mexico on November 4, 2014. All of New Mexico's executive officers were up for election as well as a United States Senate seat, and all of New Mexico's three seats in the United States House of Representatives. Primary elections were held on June 3, 2014.

Governor

Incumbent Republican Governor Susana Martinez ran for re-election to a second term in office.

Four Democrats ran for their party's nomination: Attorney General of New Mexico Gary King, State Senator Linda M. Lopez, State Senator Howie Morales, former State Executive Director of the Farm Service Agency Lawrence Rael and businessman Alan Webber.

King won the primary with 35% of the vote.

Lieutenant Governor
Unlike most states, in New Mexico, the candidates for Governor and Lieutenant Governor were elected in separate primaries. The winning candidates then run together on the same ticket.

Incumbent Republican Lieutenant Governor John Sanchez was running for re-election to a second term.

Deb Haaland was running for the Democrats. Marie Julienne had been running, but was disqualified. Chocolatier Chuck Higgins had also been in the running, but he withdrew.

Democratic primary

Republican primary

Attorney General
Incumbent Democratic Attorney General Gary King was term-limited and could not run for re-election to a third term in office. He instead ran for governor.

Hector Balderas, the State Auditor of New Mexico, was the only Democrat running. In January 2013, former Public Regulation Commissioner Jason Marks formed an exploratory committee, but he suspended his campaign in July, citing poor fundraising.

Former Las Cruces Chief Deputy District Attorney and former Third Judicial District Judge Susan Riedel ran unopposed for the Republican nomination. Attorney James Paul "Jim" Baiamonte had been running, but withdrew from the race. Matthew Chandler, the former District Attorney for the 9th Judicial District and Republican nominee for attorney general in 2010, had considered running again, but instead resigned as district attorney and opened a private law practice.

Secretary of State
Incumbent Republican Secretary of State Dianna Duran won a second term in office, defeating Democrat Maggie Toulouse Oliver.

Polling

Results

Treasurer
Incumbent Democratic State Treasurer James B. Lewis was term-limited and cannot run for re-election to a third term in office.

Former State Senator Tim Eichenberg and former Chairman of the Democratic Party of New Mexico John Wertheim ran for the Democratic nomination. Former Bernalillo County Treasurer Patrick Padilla had been running, but he was disqualified from the ballot after he failed to collect enough petition signatures. Wertheim raised the challenge and Padilla was disqualified after a district judge found he was 93 valid signatures short of the minimum requirement of 4,373. Padilla may appeal the ruling. State Senator Tim Keller had considered running, but chose to run for State Auditor instead. Las Cruces Mayor Ken Miyagishima also considered running, but decided not to.

 

Rick Lopez was the only Republican running.

State Auditor
Incumbent Democratic State Auditor Hector Balderas was term-limited and cannot run for re-election to a third term in office. He was instead running for attorney general. Democratic former State Auditor Domingo Martinez had been running, but he withdrew from the race.

Democrat Tim Keller and Republican Robert Aragon were the only candidates running.

Commissioner of Public Lands
Incumbent Democratic Commissioner of Public Lands Ray Powell was running for re-election to a second term in office.

Republican Aubrey Dunn was the only other candidate running.

Polling

Results

Public Regulation Commission
Three of the five seats on the New Mexico Public Regulation Commission were up for election.

District 2 Republican incumbent Patrick Lyons was unopposed for re-election to a second term in office.

District 4 Democratic incumbent Theresa Becenti-Aguilar was running for re-election to a second term in office. Democrats Edward J. Michael and Lynda Lovejoy were also running. No Republican filed to run for the seat.

District 5 Republican incumbent Ben Hall, the current Chairman of the Commission, was running for re-election to a second term in office. Democrats Donald L. Wolberg, Merrie Lee Soules, and Sandy R. Jones were also running.

Democrat Ken Miyagishima, the Mayor of Las Cruces, had considered running for a seat on the Commission, but decided not to.

Public Education Commission 
Seven of the ten seats on the New Mexico Public Education Commission were up for election. Five of the seats were up for regularly-scheduled elections. The other two were special elections following resignations.

District 2 incumbent Republican Millie Pogna, District 3 incumbent Democrat Carmie Lynn Toulouse, District 5 incumbent Democrat James F. Conyers and District 6 incumbent Democrat Gilbert Peralta were all running for re-election to a second term unopposed.

District 7 incumbent Democrat Eugene Gant was not running for re-election to a second term. Democrat Patricia E Gipson was running unopposed.

In the District 1 and District 4 vacancies, Democrats former State Representative Eleanor Chavez and former President of the American Federation of Teachers Karyl Ann Armbruster ran, respectively, against to-be-determined incumbents, who would be appointed to the office by Governor Martinez.

United States Senate

Incumbent Democratic Senator Tom Udall was running for re-election to a second term.

Businessman and candidate for Governor of New Mexico in 2010 Allen Weh. defeated assistant district attorney and former Chairman of the Doña Ana County Republican Party David Clements for the Republican nomination.

United States House of Representatives

All of New Mexico's three seats in the United States House of Representatives will be up for election in 2014.

References

 
New Mexico